Norway competed at the 2008 Summer Olympics in Beijing, People's Republic of China.

On 10 June, the NOC selected 50 athletes for the Olympic Games. A week later, a further eight athletes were added. More selections were made on 17 June, 1 July, 14 July (a handball squad) and 17 July. A total of 85 participants were selected for the Olympics.

Medalists

Athletics

Men
Track & road events

Field events

Women
Track & road events

Combined events – Heptathlon

* The athlete who finished in second place, Lyudmila Blonska of the Ukraine, tested positive for a banned substance. Both the A and the B tests were positive, therefore Blonska was stripped of her silver medal, and Marcussen moved up a position.

Canoeing

Sprint

Qualification Legend: QS = Qualify to semi-final; QF = Qualify directly to final

Cycling

Road

On 1 August, Thor Hushovd announced his withdrawal due to an illness, and was replaced by Nordhaug.

Mountain biking

BMX

Equestrian

Show jumping

* Tony André Hansen's horse Camiro tested positive for the pain relieving medication capsaicin, a banned substance. Hansen was later disqualified. Without Hansen's score, the team was below the threshold to advance to round 2 of the finals.  Therefore, the bronze medal was stripped and awarded to the team from Switzerland.

Fencing

Men

Football

The men's under-21 team failed to qualify after drawing with Bosnia-Herzegovina and losing to Armenia in the first qualifying stage. Meanwhile, the women's team qualified for the Olympics after placing in the semi-final round at the 2007 FIFA Women's World Cup.

Women's tournament
Roster

Group play

Handball

The women's team qualified due to winning the European Championships.

Women's tournament
Roster

Group play

Quarterfinal

Semifinal

Gold medal game

Final rank

Rowing

Men

Qualification Legend: FA=Final A (medal); FB=Final B (non-medal); FC=Final C (non-medal); FD=Final D (non-medal); FE=Final E (non-medal); FF=Final F (non-medal); SA/B=Semifinals A/B; SC/D=Semifinals C/D; SE/F=Semifinals E/F; QF=Quarterfinals; R=Repechage

Sailing

Men

Women

Open

M = Medal race; EL = Eliminated – did not advance into the medal race; CAN = Race cancelled

Shooting

Men

Women

The Norwegian Shooting Federation had suggested selecting Ingrid Stubsjøen for the team, but the Norwegian National Olympic Committee selected Vestveit instead after good performances in the final World Cup event of the 2008 season.

Swimming
Alexander Dale Oen won Norway's first ever swimming medal at the Olympics.

Men

Women

Taekwondo

Volleyball

Beach

Weightlifting

Wrestling

Men's Greco-Roman

See also
 Norway at the 2008 Summer Paralympics

References

Nations at the 2008 Summer Olympics
2008
Summer Olympics